Necrobiosis lipoidica is a necrotising skin condition that usually occurs in patients with diabetes mellitus but can also be associated with rheumatoid arthritis. In the former case it may be called necrobiosis lipoidica diabeticorum (NLD). NLD occurs in approximately 0.3% of the diabetic population, with the majority of those affected are women (approximately 3:1 females to males affected).

The severity or control of diabetes in an individual does not affect who will or will not get NLD. Better maintenance of diabetes after being diagnosed with NLD will not change how quickly the NLD will resolve.

Signs and symptoms 
NL/NLD most frequently appears on the patient's shins, often on both legs, although it may also occur on forearms, hands, trunk, and, rarely, nipple, penis, and surgical sites. The lesions are often asymptomatic but may become tender and ulcerate when injured. The first symptom of NL is often a "bruised" appearance (erythema) that is not necessarily associated with a known injury. The extent to which NL is inherited is unknown.

NLD appears as a hardened, raised area of the skin. The center of the affected area usually has a yellowish tint while the area surrounding it is a dark pink. It is possible for the affected area to spread or turn into an open sore. When this happens the patient is at greater risk of developing ulcers. If an injury to the skin occurs on the affected area, it may not heal properly or it will leave a dark scar.

Pathophysiology
Although the exact cause of this condition is not known, it is an inflammatory disorder characterised by collagen degeneration, combined with a granulomatous response. It always involves the dermis diffusely, and sometimes also involves the deeper fat layer. Commonly, dermal blood vessels are thickened (microangiopathy).

It can be precipitated by local trauma, though it often occurs without any injury.

Diagnosis 

NL is diagnosed by a skin biopsy, demonstrating superficial and deep perivascular and interstitial mixed inflammatory cell infiltrate (including lymphocytes, plasma cells, mononucleated and multinucleated histiocytes, and eosinophils) in the dermis and subcutis, as well as necrotising vasculitis with adjacent necrobiosis and necrosis of adnexal structures. Areas of necrobiosis are often more extensive and less well defined than in granuloma annulare. Presence of lipid in necrobiotic areas may be demonstrated by Sudan stains. Cholesterol clefts, fibrin, and mucin may also be present in areas of necrobiosis. Depending on the severity of the necrobiosis, certain cell types may be more predominant. When a lesion is in its early stages, neutrophils may be present, whereas in later stages of development lymphocytes and histiocytes may be more predominant.

Treatment
There is no clearly defined cure for necrobiosis. NLD may be treated with PUVA therapy, Photodynamic therapy and improved therapeutic control.

Although there are some techniques that can be used to diminish the signs of necrobiosis such as low dose aspirin orally, a steroid cream or injection into the affected area, this process may be effective for only a small percentage of those treated.

See also 
 Diabetic dermadromes
 List of cutaneous conditions

References

External links 

 Information and image at NIH

Skin conditions resulting from errors in metabolism
Diabetes